The Splat Pack is a group of independent filmmakers who, since 2002, have directed, written and produced horror films which are notable for their low budgets and extreme violence.

History
The term was coined by Alan Jones of Total Film. The group has been credited with bringing back ultra-violent movies, moving away from PG-13 rated movies and into the R-rated spectrum, all while operating with low budgets. The members have met opposition from the  MPAA board over the content of their work, but nevertheless continue to find box-office success.

Film
In 2010, a documentary film on the Splat Pack was made featuring interviews with members Alexandre Aja, Adam Green, Eli Roth, Darren Lynn Bousman, Neil Marshall, and Greg McLean.

Members 
 Alexandre Aja
 Darren Lynn Bousman
 Adam Green
 Neil Marshall
 Greg McLean
 Eli Roth
 Robert Rodriguez
 James Wan
 Leigh Whannell
 Rob Zombie

Filmography

See also
Vulgar auteurism
Extreme cinema
Video nasty
Slasher film
Exploitation film
Torture porn

References

External links
The Splat Pack on MUBI
The Splat Pack on IMDb
Eli Roth Talks 'The Splat Pack' MTV article

Lists of film directors
2000s in film
2010s in film
Groups of entertainers